Richard Head, 2nd Viscount Head (born 1937) is a retired British racehorse trainer. Head was active as a trainer in Upper Lambourn from 1968 to 1983 and gained his biggest successes with the horses Uncle Bing and Border Incident. Uncle Bing won the Topham Trophy in 1980, while Border Incident's major wins included the Jim Ford Challenge Cup and the Rehearsal Chase. Head retired from training after succeeding his father as Viscount Head in 1983 and later held positions as chairman of Wincanton Racecourse and on the board at Salisbury Racecourse. He also made occasional speeches in the House of Lords.

References

1937 births
Living people
British racehorse trainers
Viscounts in the Peerage of the United Kingdom

Head